Kachchai is place located in Thenmarachchi region,  east of Chavakachcheri.

Thenmarachchi